is a Japanese footballer who plays.

Club statistics
Updated to 23 February 2016.

References

External links

Profile at YSCC Yokohama

1992 births
Living people
Kanagawa University alumni
Association football people from Chiba Prefecture
Japanese footballers
J3 League players
YSCC Yokohama players
Association football forwards